The National Exchange Carrier Association is a profit association created in 1984 by the Federal Communications Commission to administer the fees that long distance companies pay to access local telephone networks in the United States. Through the Federal Communications Commission's access charge plan, NECA helps ensure telecommunications and broadband services remain available and affordable in all parts of the country, especially areas served by small rural telecommunications companies.

NECA is primarily made up of rural telecommunications companies, as the vast majority of rural and small telecommunications companies are members of NECA.

References

External links
 

United States communications regulation